Dagstuhl is a computer science research center in Germany, located in and named after a district of the town of Wadern, Merzig-Wadern, Saarland.

Location
Following the model of the mathematical center at Oberwolfach, the center is installed in a very remote and relaxed location in the countryside.
The Leibniz Center is located in a historic country house, Schloss Dagstuhl (Dagstuhl Castle), together with modern purpose-built buildings connected by an enclosed footbridge.

The ruins of the 13th-century Dagstuhl Castle are nearby, a short walk up a hill from the Schloss.

History
The Leibniz-Zentrum für Informatik (LZI, Leibniz Center for Informatics) was established at Dagstuhl in 1990. In 1993, the over 200-year-old building received a modern extension with other guest rooms, conference rooms and a library. The center is managed as a non-profit organization, and financed by national funds. It receives scientific support by a variety of German and foreign research institutions. Until April 2008 the name of the center  was: International Conference and Research Center for Computer Science (German: Internationales Begegnungs- und Forschungszentrum für Informatik (IBFI)). The center was founded by Reinhard Wilhelm, who continued as its director until May 2014, when Raimund Seidel became the director. The list of shareholders includes:

 German Informatics Society
 Saarland University
 Technical University of Kaiserslautern
 Karlsruhe Institute of Technology
 Technische Universität Darmstadt
 University of Stuttgart
 University of Trier
 Goethe University in Frankfurt 
 Centrum Wiskunde & Informatica, Netherlands
 Institute for Research in Computer Science and Automation, France
 Max Planck Society

In 2012, another new building was opened with 7 guest rooms. Since 1 January 2005, the LZI is a member of the Leibniz Association.

Library
Dagstuhl's computer science library has over 50,000 books and other media, among them a full set of Springer-Verlag's Lecture Notes in Computer Science (LNCS) series and electronic access to many computer science journals.

Seminar series
Dagstuhl supports computer science by organizing high ranked seminars on hot topics in informatics. Dagstuhl Seminars, which are established after review and approval by the Scientific Directorate, bring together personally invited scientists from academia and industry from all over the world to discuss their newest ideas and problems. Apart from the Dagstuhl seminars, the center also hosts summer schools, group retreats, and other scientific events, all discussing informatics. Every year about 3,500 scientists stay in Dagstuhl for about 100 seminars, workshops and other scientific events. The number of participants is limited to enable discussion and by the available housing capacity. The stay is full-board; participants are accommodated in the original house or in the modern annex, and have all their meals at the center. Seminars are usually held for a weekly period: participants arrive on Sunday evening and depart on Friday evening or Saturday morning. One or sometimes two seminars are held simultaneously with other small meetings.

The cryptographic technique DP5 (Dagstuhl Privacy Preserving Presence Protocol P) is named after Schloss Dagstuhl.

Publications
As well as publishing proceedings from its own seminars, the Leibniz Center publishes the Leibniz International Proceedings in Informatics (LIPIcs), a series of open access conference proceedings from computer science conferences worldwide. Conferences published in this series include the Symposium on Theoretical Aspects of Computer Science (STACS), held annually in Germany and France, the conference on Foundations of Software Technology and Theoretical Computer Science (FSTTCS), held annually in south Asia, the Computational Complexity Conference (CCC), held at a different international venue each year, the Symposium on Computational Geometry (SoCG), the International Colloquium on Automata, Languages and Programming (ICALP), the International Symposium on Mathematical Foundations of Computer Science (MFCS) and the International Conference on Concurrency Theory (CONCUR).

See also
Leibniz Association
FIZ Karlsruhe
Heidelberg Institute for Theoretical Studies
DBLP

References

External links

 Official website
 Schloss Dagstuhl on LinkedIn
 Schloss Dagstuhl on Twitter

Non-profit_organisations_based_in_Germany
1990 establishments in Germany
Leibniz Association
Computer science institutes in Germany
International research institutes
Castles in Saarland
Buildings and structures in Merzig-Wadern